This is a list of diplomatic missions of Serbia, excluding honorary consulates. Serbia has a significant number of diplomatic missions abroad, representing its growing ties with the West along with Yugoslavia's historical ties with Eastern Europe and the Non-Aligned Movement.

Serbia inherited about a third of the diplomatic facilities that belonged to the former Yugoslavia. After 2001 embassies in Chile, Colombia, Congo-Kinshasa, Ghana, Guinea, Lebanon, Mongolia, North Korea, Pakistan, Thailand, Venezuela, Vietnam, and Zimbabwe were closed due to financial or reciprocal reasons. In June 2008 the Government of Serbia made a decision to close consulates in Bari, Graz, and Malmö, and later that year Foreign Minister Vuk Jeremić announced a plan to open a consulate-general in Knin (Croatia) during the autumn and an embassy in Kuala Lumpur (Malaysia). Foreign Minister also announced that some diplomatic missions might be closed but also announced a plan for opening missions in Kazakhstan, Los Angeles, Pakistan, UAE and Venezuela. Construction of the new embassy in Washington and reconstruction of the existing buildings in Paris, Nairobi and Brussels is also planned. In late 2008 it was announced that due to the economic crisis expansion plans will be reviewed. In January 2009, the Government of Serbia announced opening of diplomatic trade offices. Many of them will be opened in different cities to the ones where embassies are located as they will be opened in largest economic centres. These offices will be opened in Russia, Germany, Italy, France, Austria, United Kingdom, Greece, Slovenia, Bosnia and Herzegovina, Croatia, Montenegro, Republic of North Macedonia, China, USA, Czech Republic, Slovakia, Hungary, Romania, Bulgaria, Ukraine, Switzerland, Turkey, India and South Korea. Government also announced the opening of police liaison offices for a better cooperation with foreign law enforcement agencies. In April 2009, Serbian Ministry of Foreign Affairs announced that consulate from Rijeka will be moved to Knin in Croatia. In May 2009 it was announced that the embassy in Peru will be temporarily closed and that the consulate-general in Lyon will be closed while the embassy in Kenya was reopened. Due to the legal succession of the Yugoslav properties abroad, Serbia was obliged to hand over chanceries in Vienna, The Hague and Lisbon (to Croatia), Canberra (to the then-Republic of Macedonia), Ankara, Madrid, Oslo and Ottawa (to Bosnia and Herzegovina) as well as consular chanceries in Klagenfurt, Milan (to Slovenia), Toronto (to Croatia), Zurich and Athens (to the Republic of Macedonia). Serbia will hand over the embassy building in Rome to Slovenia in 2011. In November 2010, the Government of Serbia made a decision to open embassies in Kazakhstan, Azerbaijan and Qatar and reopen embassies in Congo-Kinshasa and Ghana in 2011 and announced a plan to open embassies in Oman, Chile, Venezuela and Pakistan in the future. In March 2011, Serbia opened its embassy in Azerbaijan and Consulate-General in Herceg Novi. In June 2011, Serbia opened its embassy in Kazakhstan.

On 30 November 2006, the Government of Serbia adopted the Memorandum of Agreement between the Republic of Montenegro and the Republic of Serbia on Consular Protection and Services to the Citizens of Montenegro. By this agreement, Serbian diplomatic missions provide consular services to the Montenegrin citizens on the territory of states in which Montenegro has no missions of its own. In 2012, Serbia signed a similar agreement with Bosnia and Herzegovina that will also allow Serbian citizens to use Bosnian diplomatic and consular offices, namely those in Jordan, Malaysia, Pakistan, Qatar, Saudi Arabia and the United Arab Emirates. However, in 2013 the Serbian government has adopted a decision to establish full diplomatic relations with the United Arab Emirates and Saudi Arabia, at a meeting held on 4 February 2013.

Foreign minister Ivan Mrkić announced in January 2014 plans to open embassies in Saudi Arabia, Qatar and Ghana as well as five diplomatic offices in Venezuela, Chile, Peru, Vietnam and Cambodia by the year's end.

Current missions

Gallery

Closed missions

Europe

See also
List of Ambassadors from Serbia
List of diplomatic missions in Serbia
Foreign relations of Serbia
Serb diaspora
Serbian diaspora

Notes

External links 

Ministry of Foreign Affairs of Serbia

References

 
Serbia
Diplomatic missions